Distaplia is a genus of tunicates belonging to the family Holozoidae.

The genus has cosmopolitan distribution.

Species:

Distaplia alaidi 
Distaplia alaskensis 
Distaplia arnbackae 
Distaplia australiensis 
Distaplia bermudensis 
Distaplia caerulea 
Distaplia capensis 
Distaplia clavata 
Distaplia colligans 
Distaplia concreta 
Distaplia corolla 
Distaplia crassa 
Distaplia cuscina 
Distaplia cuspidis 
Distaplia cylindrica 
Distaplia dubia 
Distaplia durbanensis 
Distaplia florida 
Distaplia fortuita 
Distaplia galatheae 
Distaplia garstangi 
Distaplia intermedia 
Distaplia kerguelense 
Distaplia knoxi 
Distaplia livida 
Distaplia lubrica 
Distaplia lucillae 
Distaplia magnilarva 
Distaplia marplesi 
Distaplia matua 
Distaplia megathorax 
Distaplia micropnoa 
Distaplia mikropnoa 
Distaplia miyose 
Distaplia muriella 
Distaplia nathensis 
Distaplia naufragii 
Distaplia occidentalis 
Distaplia pallida 
Distaplia progressa 
Distaplia prolifera 
Distaplia racemosa 
Distaplia regina 
Distaplia retinaculata 
Distaplia rosea 
Distaplia rzhavskii 
Distaplia skoogi 
Distaplia smithi 
Distaplia stylifera 
Distaplia systematica 
Distaplia tahihuero 
Distaplia taylori 
Distaplia tokiokai 
Distaplia turboensis 
Distaplia unigermis 
Distaplia vallii 
Distaplia violetta 
Distaplia viridis

References

Tunicates